The 2000–01 Scottish Cup was the 116th staging of Scotland's most prestigious football knockout competition, also known for sponsorship reasons as the Tennent's Scottish Cup. The Cup was won by Celtic who defeated Hibernian in the final.

First round

Replays

Second round

Replays

Third round

Replays

Fourth round

1.Peterhead given bye due to Airdrieonians not able to field a full team.

Replays

Quarter-finals

Semi-finals

Final

Notes

Scottish Cup seasons
Scottish Cup, 2000-01
Scot